Madikhan Makhmetov (born 3 March 1993) is a Kazakhstani water polo player. He competed in the men's tournament at the 2020 Summer Olympics.

References

External links
 

1993 births
Living people
Kazakhstani male water polo players
Olympic water polo players of Kazakhstan
Water polo players at the 2020 Summer Olympics
Sportspeople from Almaty
Asian Games gold medalists for Kazakhstan
Asian Games medalists in water polo
Water polo players at the 2014 Asian Games
Medalists at the 2014 Asian Games
21st-century Kazakhstani people